Blue Bend is an unincorporated community in Greenbrier County, West Virginia, United States.

References

Unincorporated communities in Greenbrier County, West Virginia
Unincorporated communities in West Virginia